Ganesha Matthe Banda is a 2008 Kannada film directed by Phani Ramachandra.. JM Prahlad wrote the story, which uses Phani Ramachandra's favorite screen-title Ganesha. Movie was an attempt to reinvigorate the popular Ganesha series.

Cast
 Vijay Raghavendra as Ganesha 
 Ananth Nag as Padmanabacharya 
 Neethu as Gayathri 
 Pragna as Savithri 
 Vinaya Prasad as Sharada 
 Vishal Hegde as Shankar

Soundtrack 
The soundtrack was composed by V. Manohar.

References

2008 films
Indian comedy films

Films directed by Phani Ramachandra
2008 comedy films